Sabse Smart Kaun ( Who is Smarter) is a Hindi reality show aired on StarPlus. It premiered on 4 June 2018 on StarPlus. It was launched on StarPlus under the Rishta Wahi, Baat Nayi Campaign. The play-along feature enables the viewers to participate in each round using their phones enabling the game to be open for People who can play along through the Hotstar app.

References

StarPlus original programming
2018 Indian television series debuts
Indian game shows
Television series by Optimystix Entertainment
2018 Indian television series endings